Ryan James Watson (born 7 July 1993) is an English professional footballer who plays as a midfielder for Salford City.

Career

Wigan Athletic
After an initial spell with the academy of Everton, Watson joined the academy of Wigan Athletic in 2010. He signed professional terms in 2011 and played for the team's development squad throughout the 2011–12 season. After a brief loan spell with League Two club Accrington Stanley, Watson was one of ten players released by Wigan at the end of the 2012–13 season.

Leicester City
Watson signed a one-year deal with then Championship club Leicester City in September 2013, having impressed on trial with the club's development squad. Having continued to impress for the club's reserve team, Watson signed a two-year contract extension in June 2014. On 26 August 2014, Watson made his first team debut for the club, starting in a second round League Cup home defeat to Shrewsbury Town.

After joining Northampton Town on loan initially until January 2015, Watson suffered a cruciate ligament injury after only five appearances for the League Two club, and returned to Leicester City for treatment in October 2014. The injury would rule him out of action for the remainder of the 2014–15 season. Watson re-joined Northampton Town on loan at the beginning of the 2015–16 season, and went on to make fifteen appearances for the club, scoring a single goal in a 3–2 Football League Trophy first round win against Colchester United on 1 September 2015.

Following the expiry of his loan, Watson returned to Leicester City in January 2016 and continued to play for the club's reserve team. He captained the side in a 1–1 draw with Middlesbrough on 25 January 2016. At the end of the season, Watson was among seven players released by the club.

Barnet
On 1 July 2016, Watson joined then League Two club Barnet. After two seasons with the club, Watson was released at the end of the 2017–18 season having scored two goals in 52 appearances.

Milton Keynes Dons
On 20 June 2018, Watson joined newly-relegated League Two club Milton Keynes Dons on a one-year deal effective from 1 July 2018. He scored his first goal for the club on 14 August 2018, in a 3–0 EFL Cup first round home win over Charlton Athletic. Following limited first team opportunities, Watson was one of ten players released by the club at the end of the 2018–19 season.

Northampton Town
On 3 June 2019, Watson joined Northampton Town on a free transfer effective from 1 July 2019, having previously played for the club across two loan spells. He finished 2020/21 as player of the season and top goal scorer but chose not to sign a new contract at Northampton.

Tranmere Rovers
On 19 June 2021, Watson joined Tranmere Rovers on a two-year deal.

Salford City
On 14 January 2022, Watson signed an 18-month contract with League Two side Salford City after joining for an undisclosed fee.

Career statistics

Honours
Northampton Town
Football League Two: 2015–16
EFL League Two play-offs: 2020

Milton Keynes Dons
EFL League Two third-place promotion: 2018–19

References

External links

English footballers
1993 births
Living people
Everton F.C. players
Wigan Athletic F.C. players
Accrington Stanley F.C. players
Leicester City F.C. players
Northampton Town F.C. players
Barnet F.C. players
Milton Keynes Dons F.C. players
Tranmere Rovers F.C. players
Salford City F.C. players
English Football League players
Association football midfielders